Insulochamus thomensis is a species of beetle in the family Cerambycidae. It was described by Karl Jordan in 1903 as Monochamus thomensis. It is known from São Tomé and Príncipe.

References

Lamiini
Insects of São Tomé and Príncipe
Beetles of Africa
Beetles described in 1903